XDR (expanded dynamic range), also known as SDR (super dynamic range) is a quality-control and duplication process for the mass-production of pre-recorded audio cassettes.  It is a process designed to provide higher quality audio on pre-recorded cassettes by checking the sound quality at all stages of the tape duplication process. In this way, the dynamic range of audio recorded on an XDR-duplicated cassette can be up to 13 decibels greater.

History
XDR (Expanded Dynamic Range) was originally developed by Capitol Records in LA in their R&D facility. Before they had released anything Capitol Records-EMI of Canada was made aware of this activity and was able to release their own version called SDR (Super Dynamic Range) ahead of the American version.

Capitol Records Canada was able to do this for the following reasons:
-Back in the early 80's Capitol Records Canada functioned separately from the US counterparts.
-Capitol Records Canada involved a three person team to bring this to fruition.
-Capitol Records LA had the added complexity of developing the system in kit form to ship out to its Manufacturing facilities.
-Capitol Records LA developed a sophisticated high speed tone generator to inject tones into the slave duplicators.
-Instead of the more complex high speed test tones generator, Capitol Records Canada, designed a real time test tone generator and recorded these tones onto the one inch master along with the music.
-This not only reduced design time but also allowed Capitol Records Canada to test the entire chain from the master tape to the final cassette tape.
-Capitol Records Canada became known for producing a consistent quality sounding product.
-After some time Capitol Records Canada was asked to re-brand to "XDR". to put Capitol Records Canada in line with the rest of Capitol Records.

Process
The XDR/SDR process involves  many steps, the most prominent being:

 Duplication of the cassettes from a 1"-wide master loop tape mounted in a loop bin duplicator (as opposed to standard cassette duplication using a 1/2" master loop tape), resulting in clearer high frequencies, greater bass response, and less noise.

 On some cassettes, the use of digital tapes to prepare the wide-track duplication masters.

 Recording a short test toneburst at the beginning and end of the program material on the cassettes, to detect for any loss of audio frequencies in the audio spectrum. These tones are recorded then read during the duplication process to detect if there is any loss of any audio information.

As well as with EMI & Capitol Records, PolyGram and other labels also offered cassette releases duplicated with the XDR process.

Test Tones

Several different tonebursts were used during the life of the XDR/SDR process.

 15 sinewave tones, all but the last 0.127 seconds in length (with 0.023 seconds of silence between tones), of the following estimated frequencies: 50, 100, 250, 400, 640, 1010, 1610, 4000, 6350, 8100, 10100, 12600, 15200, and 18300 Hz, followed by 130ms of silence then 820ms of a 15200 Hz tone. (used by EMI Canada in 1982 as SDR)

 11 sinewave tones, again 0.127s in length with 0.023s of silence, of the following estimated frequencies: 32 Hz,  64 Hz,  128 Hz,  256 Hz,  512 Hz,  1000 Hz,  2000 Hz,  4000 Hz,  8820 Hz,  11,025 Hz,  18,000 Hz

 Chords of F# sinewave tones ranging from roughly 46.25 Hz (F#1) to 17739.69 Hz (C#10).

Album ID

XDR tonebursts tend to be at both the beginning of side 1 and end of side 2. Some XDR cassettes include a series of DTMF-like dual-tones after the second toneburst at the end of the tape which uniquely identifies the album. Each dual-tone is 65 milliseconds long and separated by 35 milliseconds of silence. XDR's dual-tones are a modified form of DTMF where each of the two frequencies is one-half the usual specification.

References

1982 establishments in Canada
Audio storage
Capitol Records
Sound recording